EED may refer to: 

 Polycomb protein EED, encoded by the EED gene
 EED, Inc., an American consulting firm
 Electro Explosive Device
 Employee experience design
 Empty envelope deposit
 EU Energy Efficiency Directive 2012
 European Endowment for Democracy
 Environmental Enteric Dysfunction